The Vancouver version of the NWA International Tag Team Championship was a tag team title in NWA All Star Wrestling. It was established in 1982 as the top tag team championship in that promotion after the NWA Canadian Tag Team title became inactive early that year, but was demoted to secondary status after the Canadian championship was reactivated in June 1983 and remained the secondary tag team title until All Star withdrew from the NWA in late-1985, at which point the title was abandoned.

Title history

References

External links
NWA International Tag Team title history (Vancouver)

National Wrestling Alliance championships
Professional wrestling in British Columbia
International professional wrestling championships